The 2015–16 Towson Tigers women's basketball team represents Towson University during the 2015–16 NCAA Division I women's basketball season. The Tigers, led by third year head coach Niki Reid Geckeler, play their home games at SECU Arena and were members of the Colonial Athletic Association. They finished the season 7–24, 3–15 CAA play to finish in a tie for ninth place. They advanced to the quarterfinals of the CAA women's tournament where they lost to Drexel.

Roster

Schedule

|-
!colspan=9 style="background:#000000; color:#FFD600;"| Non-conference regular season

|-
!colspan=9 style="background:#000000; color:#FFD600;"| CAA regular season

|-
!colspan=9 style="background:#000000; color:#FFD600;"| CAA Tournament

See also
2015–16 Towson Tigers men's basketball team

References

Towson Tigers women's basketball seasons
Towson